During the 2003–04 English football season, Crystal Palace competed in the Football League First Division.

Season summary
Crystal Palace started the season on the right foot, winning their first three games to top the table, but that was as good as it got under manager Steve Kember and, after a 5–0 defeat at newly promoted Wigan Athletic in November saw the club in 20th place, Kember was sacked (chairman Simon Jordan had previously declared that Kember would have a "job for life" at Palace). Kit Symons stepped up as caretaker until Northern Irishman and former Palace striker Iain Dowie was appointed. Under Dowie, Palace rocketed up the table to reach the play-offs. After beating Sunderland on penalties in the semi-final to reach the Millennium Stadium, they beat West Ham United to regain promotion to the Premiership.

Crucial to Palace's promotion was striker Andy Johnson, who scored 28 times in the league alone. He finished as the First Division's top scorer, and was voted as the club's Player of the Year.

Kit
English company Admiral Sportswear became Palace's kit manufacturers. The new home kit retained the navy shorts worn last season, albeit with a new blue and red striped design along the sides, and the navy socks, which now featured white trim. Palace's traditional blue and red striped shirts were modified with navy trim on the sleeves.

Churchill Insurance remained the kit sponsors for the fourth consecutive season.

Final league table

Results
Crystal Palace's score comes first

Legend

Football League First Division

First Division play-offs

FA Cup

League Cup

Players

First-team squad

Left club during season

Notes

References

2003-04
Crystal Palace